Tsetserleg (garden) may signify:

 Tsetserleg (city), the capital of Arkhangai aimag in Mongolia
 two sums (districts) in different aimags of Mongolia:
 Tsetserleg, Arkhangai
 Tsetserleg, Khövsgöl